The USATF Distance Classic is an annual track and field meeting in Eagle Rock, Los Angeles, California, hosted at the Occidental College track facility. Before 2015, it was called the USATF High Performance Distance Classic, and in 2015 and 2016 the meet was renamed to the HOKA ONE ONE Middle Distance Classic as per sponsorship from Hoka One One before going back to USATF Distance Classic in 2017. For short, the meet is frequently referred to as just Oxy.

The meet takes place at night to provide ideal conditions for distance running, and it has played host to several Olympians and domestic talents.

Event Records

Men

Women

References

Sports competitions in Los Angeles
Recurring sporting events established in 2010
2010 establishments in California